Conizonia bodoani is a species of beetle in the family Cerambycidae. It was described by Maurice Pic in 1912, originally under the genus Phytoecia. It is known from Azerbaijan, Turkey and Iran.

References

Saperdini
Beetles described in 1912